Emily Sofia Alvarado Natividad (born 9 June 1998) is an American-born Mexican professional footballer who plays as a goalkeeper for the Mexico women's national team. She was a team captain and starter for Texas Christian University's Division 1 Women's Soccer program in Fort Worth, Texas.

International career
Alvarado made her senior debut for Mexico on 26 May 2019 in a friendly match against the United States.

Honors and awards

International
Mexico U17
 CONCACAF Women's U-17 Championship: 2013

Mexico U20
 CONCACAF Women's U-20 Championship: 2018

Individual
 2018 CONCACAF Women's U-20 Championship: Golden Glove

References

External links
 
 Profile  at Mexican Football Federation
 

1998 births
Living people
Citizens of Mexico through descent
Mexican women's footballers
Women's association football goalkeepers
Mexico women's international footballers
2015 FIFA Women's World Cup players
Pan American Games competitors for Mexico
Footballers at the 2019 Pan American Games
Soccer players from El Paso, Texas
American women's soccer players
TCU Horned Frogs women's soccer players
American sportspeople of Mexican descent